Southasia Magazine is a Pakistani/English-language political and news magazine published from Pakistan. The magazine publishes news and analysis about South Asia and international affairs. It is edited and published by Syed Jawaid Iqbal, and is distributed in the United States by JAYEYE Associates.

Southasia Magazine was formerly called Thirdworld International which was established in 1977. It changed its name in 1997. It is a certified member of the All Pakistan Newspapers Society (APNS).

References

External links

1977 establishments in Pakistan
English-language magazines published in Pakistan
Magazines established in 1977
Mass media in Karachi
Monthly magazines published in Pakistan
News magazines published in Pakistan